Ulrich 'Uli' Sude (born 19 April 1956 in Korbach) is a German former footballer who became a coach. He spent 11 seasons in the Bundesliga with Borussia Mönchengladbach. As of March 2009, he works as a scout for the Borussia Mönchengladbach youth team.

Honours
Borussia Mönchengladbach
 European Cup runner-up: 1977
 UEFA Cup: 1979
 UEFA Cup finalist: 1980
 Bundesliga: 1977; runner-up 1978
 DFB-Pokal runner-up: 1984

References

1956 births
Living people
People from Korbach
Sportspeople from Kassel (region)
German footballers
Association football goalkeepers
Borussia Mönchengladbach players
Bundesliga players
German football managers
VfL Osnabrück managers
FC 08 Homburg managers
1. FC Saarbrücken managers
SC Verl managers
Footballers from Hesse
West German footballers